Łowicz is a stony-iron meteorite (mesosiderite) which fell on 12 March 1935 at 0:50 in the area of Krępa Rzeczyce and Wrzeczko villages,  south of Łowicz. Numerous specimens were recovered.

See also
 Glossary of meteoritics
 Meteorite fall

External links
 Meteorical Bulletin Database: Łowicz

Meteorites found in Poland
1935 in Poland